The Cut, written by John Misto, is an Australian drama television series which screened in 2009 on ABC1. The series contains six one-hour episodes and stars John Wood. 
The show was first announced in February 2008 and was filmed in June/July 2008.

Synopsis

The Cut is the story of Bill Telford, a colourful sporting identity (player/manager/agent), who has fallen on his feet in the past decade as Australian professional sports have boomed. Bill is injured in a bomb attack in Bangkok. His estranged son, Andrew, is reluctantly persuaded by his mother to return to Sydney and run the business until Bill recovers. Andrew uncovers  financial disaster and must confront several skeletons in the closet.

Cast
 John Wood as 'Wild' Bill Telford
 Matt Passmore as Andrew Telford
 Ben Oxenbould as Danny
 Julieanne Newbould as Roz Telford
 Eloise Oxer as Naomi
 Diarmid Heidenreich as Jason Kerslake
 Ria Vandervis as Vanessa Stewart
 Kelly Butler as Sandy Haffner
 Paul Barry as Karl
 Ian Roberts as Sports Beat Anchor
 John McNeil as Stan
 Bill Young as Ray

Episode list
Episode information retrieved from the Australian Television Archive here

See also
 List of Australian television series
 List of Australian Broadcasting Corporation programs

References

2009 Australian television series debuts
2009 Australian television series endings
Australian drama television series
Australian Broadcasting Corporation original programming